Boreham Street is a small village in the Wealden district of East Sussex, England.
A number of listed buildings line the village high street. Boreham Street sits atop a ridge with views south over the Pevensey Levels towards Normans Bay and the coast and to the north over open farmland.
Boreham Street has the 'Bull's Head' public house and Scolfe's restaurant/tea rooms. The village hall, Reid Hall, holds local events.

Villages in East Sussex
Wealden District